Natural is the fourth studio album by American alternative rock band The Special Goodness, released on May 22, 2012 on Surf Green Records. Upon the album's release, Patrick Wilson noted, "You can get a six-inch turkey from Subway and be happy for thirty minutes, or get the new The Special Goodness and be happy forever."

Background and recording
The album was recorded solely by founding member Patrick Wilson, with Wilson noting, "At some point, I just sort of stopped trying to make [the Special Goodness] a band and just said, 'I'm not going to be happy unless I do everything myself,' which is totally ironic because that's not really my personality."

Release
Prior to its release, the album was available to stream on Spotify. The only physical copies available are CD-R's produced by amazon on demand.

Track listing
"Everywhere" - 3:59
"It's Only Natural" - 2:52
"Nowhere" - 4:26
"Hold On" - 2:19
"Reason to Worry" - 4:02
"The Diamond" - 3:54
"Just Like Me" - 3:07
"Head On/Head Out" - 2:23
"Sun Off of the Sea" - 2:42
"There is a Book" - 3:15

Personnel
Patrick Wilson - vocals, guitar, bass, keyboards, drums

References

2012 albums
The Special Goodness albums